The Federal Energy Administration (FEA) was a United States government organization created in 1974 to address the 1970s energy crisis, and specifically the 1973 oil crisis. It was merged in 1977 with the  Energy Research and Development Administration (ERDA) into the newly created United States Department of Energy.

History
In 1973, the Organization of Petroleum Exporting Countries placed an oil embargo on nations perceived as assisting Israel in the Yom Kippur War. To combat the embargo, President Nixon established the Federal Energy Office (FEO) in December 1973, which was tasked with coordinating the American response to the embargo. The FEA was tasked with managing fuel allocation, pricing regulation, and energy data collection and analysis. The Energy Research and Development Administration (ERDA) was created by the Energy Reorganization Act of 1974 and managed the energy research and development, nuclear weapons, and naval reactors programs.

In December 1975, Energy Policy and Conservation Act directed the FEA to change petroleum pricing regulations such that crude oil prices would rise gradually. Additionally, subject to congressional review, the FEA could now remove refined petroleum products from pricing controls. By June 1976, fuel oil, middle distillates, naphtha, and gas oils were no longer under pricing controls.

The Federal Energy Administration Act created the first U.S. agency with the primary focus on energy and mandated it to collect, assemble, evaluate, and analyze energy information. It also provided FEA with data collection enforcement authority for gathering data from energy producing and major consuming firms. Section 52 of the FEA Act mandated establishment of the National Energy Information System to "contain such energy information as is necessary to carry out the Administration’s statistical and forecasting activities."

The Department of Energy Organization Act of 1977 created the United States Department of Energy (USDOE), which merged ERDA and FEA under USDOE. It also created the Energy Information Administration as the primary Federal Government authority on energy statistics and analysis.

Leaders
National Energy Office
Charles DiBona (April 18, 1973 – July 16, 1973)

Energy Policy Office
John Love (July 16, 1973 – December 4, 1973)

Federal Energy Office
William E. Simon (December 4, 1973 – May 9, 1974)
John Sawhill (May 9, 1974 – June 28, 1974)

Federal Energy Administration
John Sawhill (June 28, 1974 – December 18, 1974)
Frank Zarb (December 18, 1974 – January 15, 1977)
Gorman Smith, Acting (January 15, 1977 – February 5, 1977)
John O'Leary (February 5, 1977 – September 30, 1977)

Andrew Gibson was nominated to succeed Sawhill but was withdrawn before the Senate had a chance to act on it.

Deputy Administrators 

 John Sawhill (June 28, 1974 – December 18, 1974)
 Eric Zausner (December 18, 1974 – Designated Acting July 31, 1976)
 John Hill (Early 1975 – July 1976)
 David Bardin (May 1977 – September 30, 1977)
 Gorman Smith, Acting (February 1977 – June 1977)

References

External links
 General Records of the Department of Energy via United States National Archives
 The Federal Energy Administration, a history of the FEA from the United States Department of Energy
 Historic technical reports from the Federal Energy Administration (and other Federal agencies) are available in the Technical Report Archive and Image Library (TRAIL)

Energy in the United States
Federal Energy Administration